The 2004–05 ECHL season was the 17th season of the ECHL.  The Brabham Cup regular season champions were the Pensacola Ice Pilots and the Kelly Cup playoff champions were the Trenton Titans.

During this season, the National Hockey League cancelled its season due to the player lockout. This led to many players who would normally be in the American Hockey League pushed out of roster spots by the younger NHL players back into the ECHL. Some NHL players also found work in the ECHL, some as a way to return to their hometowns (or their wives'), and others to give back to the league which gave them a start.  Scott Gomez chose to return home to his Anchorage roots and played for the Alaska Aces. Curtis Brown played for his wife's hometown in San Diego. Jeremy Stevenson, who played his first professional season with Greensboro ten years before, returned to the Carolinas with the South Carolina Stingrays.  Stevenson's NHL teammate Shane Hnidy, who played 21 games with the former Baton Rouge Kingfish as a rookie, returned to the South playing for the Florida Everblades. Hnidy and Stevenson would find themselves playing against each other in the first round of the Kelly Cup Playoffs.  Bates Battaglia joined his younger brother Anthony on the Mississippi Sea Wolves of the ECHL.

League changes
After the 2003–04 season, the Columbus Cottonmouths, Greensboro Generals, and Roanoke Express franchises all ceased operations as their franchises were revoked. The Columbus organization joined the Southern Professional Hockey League for 2004–05 as one of its inaugural members. Their ECHL franchise had planned to be in Bradenton, Florida, as the Gulf Coast Swords but eventually had its franchise revoked in the September 2006 ECHL Board of Governors meeting after several issues led to them never completing their arena.  The Cincinnati Cyclones requested a voluntary suspension of franchise, which was lifted for the 2006–07 season, when the crosstown Cincinnati Mighty Ducks ownership failed to secure an American Hockey League franchise.

The league added one team for the season, their first Canadian franchise, the Victoria Salmon Kings. The Salmon Kings purchased the defunct Baton Rouge Kingfish franchise and relocated its home territory to Victoria.

Realignment
The league also adopted a "Mason-Dixon" format, as the conferences were split on the Mason–Dixon line, with the National Conference teams being north of the line and American Conference teams south of the line creating a "North vs South" format.

All-Star Game
The ECHL All-Star Game was held at the Sovereign Center in Reading, Pennsylvania, and was hosted by the Reading Royals.  The National Conference All-Stars defeated the American Conference All-Stars 6–2, with Idaho's Frank Doyle named Most Valuable Player.

Regular season

Final standings
Note: GP = Games played; W = Wins; L= Losses; OTL = Overtime Losses; SOL = Shootout Losses; GF = Goals for; GA = Goals against; Pts = PointsGreen shade = Clinched playoff spot; Blue shade = Clinched division; (z) = Clinched home-ice advantage

American Conference

National Conference

Scoring leaders
Note: GP = Games played; G = Goals; A = Assists; Pts = Points; PIM = Penalty minutes

Leading goaltenders
Note: GP = Games played; Mins = Minutes played; W = Wins; L = Losses; T = Ties; GA = Goals allowed; SO = Shutouts; GAA = Goals against average

Kelly Cup playoffs

ECHL awards

See also
 ECHL All-Star Game
 Kelly Cup

References

External links
ECHL website

 
ECHL seasons
ECHL season, 2004-05